Milestones, also referred as The Milestones (per the Eurovision official web site), were an Austrian rock band, active between 1968 and 1975.  They are known for their participation in the 1972 Eurovision Song Contest.

1968-1972 
The band's original line up was Beatrix Neundlinger, Günter Grosslercher, Robert Unterweger and Rudi Tinsobin. Their first self-titled album was released in 1970.  In 1972, Unterweger and Tinsobin left the band and were replaced by Norbert Niedermeyer and Christian Kolonovits.

Eurovision Song Contest 
In 1972, Milestones were selected internally by broadcaster ORF as the Austrian representatives for the 17th Eurovision Song Contest with the song "Falter im Wind" ("Butterfly In the Wind"), which was a very contemporary and atypical song for Eurovision at the time.  At the contest, held in Edinburgh on 25 March, "Falter im Wind" proved unexpectedly popular with the jurors, finishing in fifth place of 18 entries.  It remains one of Austria's most successful Eurovision entries, as only four songs have placed higher.

1973-1975 
The band's second album, Emigration, was released in 1973.  They split up in 1975;  Neundlinger and Grosslercher joined the group Schmetterlinge, with which they would make another Eurovision appearance in 1977, while Niedermeyer became a member of Springtime who became Austria's Eurovision entrants in 1978. Kolonovits moved into music production.

Discography 

Singles
1969: "Einmal"
1970: "An diesem Freitag" 
1971: "Paul" 
1971: "20 Uhr 02"
1972: "Falter im Wind"
1973: "Apfelbaum"
1974: "Schade" 

Albums
1970: Milestones
1973: Emigration

References

External links 
 Milestones Information pages (German)
 Official Eurovision Song Contest site, history by year, 1972

Austrian rock music groups
Eurovision Song Contest entrants for Austria
Eurovision Song Contest entrants of 1972